Abdoul Karim Bangoura (born 9 February 1971) is a Guinean former professional football defender. He was a squad member at the 1994 and 1998 Africa Cup of Nations.

References

External links
 

1971 births
Living people
Association football defenders
Guinean footballers
Guinea international footballers
Guinea youth international footballers
1994 African Cup of Nations players
1998 African Cup of Nations players
SC Bastia players
FC Martigues players
Amiens SC players
Guinean expatriate footballers
Expatriate footballers in France
Guinean expatriate sportspeople in France
Ligue 1 players
Ligue 2 players
Championnat National players